William Taussig (February 28, 1826 – July 10, 1913) was
a St. Louis physician and businessperson. He managed the
business affairs associated with building the Eads Bridge and its later
operation.

Biography
Taussig was born in the city of Prague, the third city
of the Austrian Empire, and the commercial
and manufacturing center of Bohemia. He
was educated at the University of Prague, and after completing
the classical course, turned his attention
to the study of medicine, devoting himself
chiefly to chemistry. In 1847, he emigrated to
the United States, and for a year was employed
in New York City as an analytical chemist.
Leaving New York in 1848, he came to
St. Louis and soon after his arrival
became connected with the drug house of
Charless, Blow & Co. as chemist. To further
qualify himself for the practice of medicine,
he attended a course of lectures
at Pope's Medical College, and then
started a medical practice.

During the a cholera epidemic in 1849, he
served the city as assistant physician and
apothecary at quarantine. In 1851, he moved to Carondelet,
then an independent city, but now part of St. Louis.
There he soon built up a very extensive practice.
In 1852, he was elected mayor of the city, and
held that office until failing health compelled
him to retire from the position, and also to
give up his large medical practice.

In 1859, he became one of the judges of the St. Louis
County Court, joining John H. Lightner, Benjamin
Farrar, Robert Holmes and John H. Fisse
being his associates. This court, or
board, had almost absolute control of all
the financial and administrative affairs of
St. Louis County during the Civil War, and on it rested the chief
responsibilities of county government. Taussig and his colleagues
were chosen as a reform board,
their immediate predecessors having drawn popular condemnation for their conduct of county affairs. The court inaugurated numerous reforms. In 1863, Taussig was reelected to the county court; he served as presiding justice until he resigned in 1865.

During Taussig's service,
Captain Ulysses S. Grant was rejected for a position as county
surveyor. Grant soon afterward went to
Galena, Illinois. Later, during a visit to St. Louis,
General Grant told Taussig he was
indebted to him for his action in the matter.

Taussig was presiding on the county
bench when General Sterling Price made his
last raid through Missouri and threatened to
capture St. Louis. Supported by his
associates, Taussig moved to raise
two regiments of troops to reinforce the
inadequate reserves defending the city under
command of General Rosecrans.
The much needed additional
military force could only be raised by giving
generous bounties to encourage the enlistment
of troops. There was, however, no money
in the county treasury, and $200,000 was
needed to meet the expenses of the proposed
movement. So Taussig negotiated a loan.

Also during the Civil War, when marauders —
calling themselves Confederates — under the
command of "Bill" Anderson fell upon the
town of Fulton, Missouri, and robbed and
destroyed the insane asylum at that place, the
inmates of that institution were
left without a place of refuge. Taussig,
upon hearing of the disaster,
provided for their relief.
Accompanied by Captain Bartholomew Guion,
he arrived at Fulton, and speedily organized a relief
movement with the assistance of residents in the vicinity.
He gathered together those who had been inmates
of the asylum, over two hundred in number, and
loaded them into vehicles of various kinds, and finally landed them
at Mexico, Missouri. The region traversed
was infested with guerrillas, and Taussig
and his party had no military escort; 
however, they reached their destination
in safety and proceeded by rail to St.
Louis. Here, by previous arrangement, the
doors of St. Vincent Asylum were thrown
open to them.

While serving on
the county court bench Taussig was also
examining surgeon for the First Military
District, by appointment of President Lincoln, his
duty in this connection being to pass upon
the physical condition of men drafted into the
Union Army. In 1865 he was appointed
United States Internal Revenue collector by
President Lincoln, he being the second
appointee to that office in St. Louis. Soon after
the close of the war, he became first
president of the Traders' Bank.

He joined James B. Eads in the project to construct a
bridge across the Mississippi River. At the
first meeting of the executive committee of
the Illinois & St. Louis Bridge & Tunnel
Company he was appointed chairman, and from that time until his
retirement in 1896 managed the vast interests
connected with the bridge and tunnel. The only other enterprise
with which he was identified during that
time was the North Missouri Railway Company,
of which he served two years as director.
In July 1874, upon completion of the bridge,
he was appointed general manager of the St.
Louis Bridge Company, the Tunnel Railroad
Company, the Union Railway & Transit
Company, and the Union Depot Company,
all of which interests were finally, by lease and
purchase, combined under the general ownership
and control of the Terminal Railroad
Association of St. Louis. This association made
Taussig its president in 1889, and from
that time forward until the date of its completion
he devoted himself to the perfection of
a railroad terminal system for St.
Louis and to the building of the Union Depot.

In 1872, he joined Carl Schurz, Emil Preetorius,
Gratz Brown, William M. Grosvenor and Henry T. Blow in the
Liberal Republican Party.

Family
In 1857, Taussig married Adele Wuerpel of St.
Louis. Their son Frank William Taussig became
professor of political economy in
Harvard College.  F. W. Taussig's last publication was "My Father's Business Career," Harvard Business Review, 1941.

Notes

References
This article includes text from a publication in the public domain: 

1826 births
1913 deaths
Physicians from Missouri
Businesspeople from St. Louis
Austrian Empire emigrants to the United States
19th-century American businesspeople
People from Prague in health professions
American people of Czech-Jewish descent